Julia Williams (July 1, 1811 - January 7, 1870) was an American abolitionist who was active in Massachusetts. Born free in Charleston, South Carolina, she moved with her family as a child to Boston, Massachusetts, and was educated in the North. A member of the Boston Female Anti-Slavery Society, she attended the Anti-Slavery Convention of American Women in New York in 1837. She married abolitionist Henry Highland Garnet and in 1852 they traveled to Jamaica to work as missionaries, where she headed an industrial school for girls. After the American Civil War, she worked with freedmen in Washington, DC to establish their new lives.

Early life and education
Julia Williams was born to free people of color in Charleston, South Carolina, in 1811. Her family moved to Boston, Massachusetts, when she was a child.  A sister was later reportedly purchased out of slavery using funds supplied by Earro Weems, mother of escaped slave Anna Maria Weems and Stella (Mary Jane) Weems, the latter daughter having lived for a time with Williams and her husband Henry Highland Garnet.  Williams was 21 years old when she traveled to Canterbury, Connecticut, to attend Prudence Crandall's Canterbury Female Boarding School, a school for "young Ladies and little Misses of color". After the school closed due to public violence, Williams went to the Noyes Academy in Canaan, New Hampshire. In 1835 it also had to close after violent opposition from local whites. Williams completed her education at the Oneida Institute in New York.

Williams became an outspoken advocate of abolition and African-American rights. Returning to Boston on a teaching appointment after her education, she became a member of the Boston Female Anti-Slavery Society (BFASS) during the 1830s. She was one of four delegates from the BFASS who attended the Anti-Slavery Convention of American Women in New York in 1837.

In 1841 Williams married Henry Highland Garnet, a teacher, minister, and prominent African-American leader of the abolitionist movement who was based in New York City. They had first met as students at the Noyes Academy; he also completed his education at the Oneida Institute. They had three children but only one, a daughter, survived to adulthood. 

In 1852, the Garnet family traveled to the Caribbean island of Jamaica to work as missionaries. Julia headed a Female Industrial School. They returned to the United States after a few years because of her husband's health needs. They settled in Washington, DC, where he was minister of the Fifteenth Street Presbyterian Church. After the Civil War, Julia Garnet worked with freedmen in the capital.

In 2014 the Prudence Crandall Museum was preparing an exhibit interpreting the life of Williams, but the school site has undergone restoration and does not have exhibits as of 2022, only tours.

References

Sources 
 "Students at Prudence Randall's School for African-American Women 1833 – 1834", State of Connecticut – Connecticut Commission on Culture and Tourism
 Yellin, Jean Fagan ; Van Horne, John C. The Abolitionist Sisterhood: Women's Political Culture in Antebellum America. Ithaca: Cornell University Press, 1994.
 Gold Hansen, Debra. Strained Sisterhood: Gender and Class in the Boston Female Anti-Slavery Society. Amherst: University of Massachusetts Press, 1993.
 Weston, Anne Warren, 1812–1890; Weston, Deborah, b.1814 recipient. [Letter to] My Dear Debora[h] [manuscript] (1837). Internet Archive. Call number: 39999063210411. Digitizing sponsor: Associates of the Boston Public Library / The Boston Foundation. Book contributor: Boston Public Library.

1811 births
1870 deaths
Abolitionists from Boston
19th-century American people
People from Charleston, South Carolina
People from Boston
Oneida Institute alumni
Noyes Academy students who enrolled at the Oneida Institute